The Anglican Catholic Church in Australia (ACCA) is the regional jurisdiction of the Traditional Anglican Church for Australia. 

The former bishop ordinary of the ACCA, John Hepworth, was also the primate of the Traditional Anglican Communion (now called the Traditional Anglican Church).

In February 2010, the Anglican Catholic Church in Australia, along with Forward in Faith Australia, filed a petition to the Roman Catholic Church's Congregation for the Doctrine of the Faith at the Vatican to join the Roman Catholic Church as a personal ordinariate under the apostolic constitution Anglicanorum Coetibus. The Church of Torres Strait (a diocese in Queensland) submitted a similar but separate proposal in May 2010.

Archbishop Hepworth resigned as bishop ordinary of the ACCA on 2 August 2012.

Some priests of the ACCA have joined the Australian Personal Ordinariate of Our Lady of the Southern Cross, along with some of their people. Despite the corporate petitions to Rome, Anglicanorum Coetibus did not make any provisions for the reception of entire ecclesial bodies. Some clergy and parishes remained in the ACCA and on 18 October 2013 (the 25th anniversary of the consecration of Albert Haley, the first bishop ordinary of the ACCA) a new bishop ordinary, Michael Pope, was consecrated for the ACCA in Lincoln, England, in the same ceremony in which Ian Gray was consecrated for the Traditional Anglican Church in Britain. 

The ACCA is not affiliated with the Missionary Diocese of Australia & New Zealand of the Anglican Catholic Church (Original Province).

References

External links

 Traditional Anglican Communion website

Anglicanism in Australia
Anglicanism in Oceania
Christian denominations in Australia
Anglicanism in New Zealand